Ernakulam Patna Express may refer to:

 Ernakulam–Patna Express (via Chennai)
 Ernakulam–Patna Express (via Tirupati)